Saburov (feminine: Saburova)  is a Russian-language surname. It may refer to:

, a family of Russian nobility
 Maksim Saburov (1900-1977), Soviet engineer, economist and politician 
 Peter Petrovich Saburov (1880-1932), Russian diplomat, chess player and composer
 Peter Alexandrovich Saburov (1835–1918), Russian diplomat, collector of ancient Greek sculpture and antiquities, and a strong amateur chess player
 Alexander Saburov (1908-1974), a leader of Soviet partisan movement in Ukraine and western Russia during the German-Soviet War
Solomonia Saburova
Irina Saburova
Agrafena Saburova

Russian-language surnames